Anolis divius, the Baoruco blue anole, is a species of lizard in the family Dactyloidae. The species is found in the Dominican Republic.

References

Anoles
Endemic fauna of the Dominican Republic
Reptiles of the Dominican Republic
Reptiles described in 2016
Taxa named by Gunther Köhler
Taxa named by Stephen Blair Hedges